Jessica Jane Harrington (née Fowler, born 12 February 1947)
is an Irish professional horse trainer. Harrington specialises in National Hunt racing but has also had success in Flat racing.

Personal life
Harrington was born in London. Her father was Brigadier Bryan Fowler, an officer in the British Army, and her mother was Mary Walford. Bryan Fowler was originally from Kells, County Meath and served with the Royal Artillery in both World Wars, and married Mary, who was a widow, in 1944. She had two children from her previous marriage. Harrington had an older brother, John Fowler, who was also a racehorse trainer and died in an accident in 2008 at their family estate in Summerhill, County Meath. Bryan Fowler left the army in 1949 and returned with his family to Ireland where Harrington spent her childhood. She did not go to school until she was aged twelve, being tutored. She then went to school at Hatherop in England for four years before going to a Finishing school in France.

Harrington was married to David Lloyd at the age of 21; their marriage ended in 1976 and they had two children, James and Tara. Harrington later married bloodstock agent Johnny Harrington and remained married to him until his death from cancer in April 2014. Together the couple had two daughters, Emma and Kate.  As well, Jessica and Johnny had three sons-in-law, a daughter-in-law and seven grandchildren.

Professional life
Before Harrington got her training permit in 1989, she had earned a reputation for being one of Ireland's top three-day event riders.  She represented her country on three levels:  European, World and Olympic.  In 1994, Harrington's horse Oh So Grumpy earned himself (and indirectly Harrington) a “landmark success” at the Galway Hurdle.   A couple of years later Dance Beat picked up Leopardstown's Ladbroke Handicap Hurdle. By 1996 Harrington had earned a reputation for being linked to high-profile horses.  She then went on to enjoy seven Cheltenham Festival victories, rendering her "one of the most successful current Irish trainers at the meeting." Her most notable horses include: Moscow Flyer, Curtain Call, Bible Belt, Pathfork and Laughing Lashes. 
On 17 March 2017 she won the Cheltenham Gold Cup with Sizing John and the following month won the Irish Grand National at Fairyhouse racecourse. It was a first win, in both races, for both Harrington and rider Robbie Power.

Major wins
 Ireland
 Irish Gold Cup  -(1) 	Sizing John (2017)
 Irish 1,000 Guineas – (1) Alpha Centauri (2018)
 Irish Oaks - (1) Magical Lagoon (2022)
 Irish Champion Hurdle  - (2) 	Macs Joy (2005), Supasundae (2018)
 Punchestown Champion Hurdle  - (4) Moscow Flyer (2001), Macs Joy (2006), Jezki (2014), Supasundae (2018)
 Punchestown Champion Chase  - (1) Moscow Flyer (2004)
 Punchestown Gold Cup  - (1) Sizing John (2017)
 National Stakes - (1) Pathfork (2010)
 Matron Stakes – (1)  No Speak Alexander (2021)
 Moyglare Stud Stakes - (1) -  Discoveries (2021) 
 Phoenix Stakes – (1) Lucky Vega (2020)
 Champion Stayers Hurdle  - (2) Jetson (2014), Jezki (2015)
 Herald Champion Novice Hurdle  - (4) Dance Beat (1996), Moscow Flyer (2000), Jezki (2013), Don't Touch It (2016)
 Morgiana Hurdle  - (1) Moscow Flyer (2000)
 Royal Bond Novice Hurdle  - (3) Moscow Flyer (1999), Hide the Evidence (2006), Jezki (2012)
 Hatton's Grace Hurdle  - (1) Jezki (2013)
 John Durkan Memorial Punchestown Chase  - (1) Sizing John (2017)
 Racing Post Novice Chase  - (1) Moscow Flyer (2001)
 Greenmount Park Novice Chase  - (1) Intelligent (2002)
 Arkle Novice Chase  - (2) Bust Out (2003), Ulaan Baatar (2005)
 Paddy's Reward Club Chase - (2) Moscow Flyer (2002,2003)
 Paddy Power Future Champions Novice Hurdle - (1) Jezki (2012)
 December Festival Hurdle - (2) Moscow Flyer (2000), Macs Joy (2004)
 Fort Leney Novice Chase  - (2) Bostons Angel (2010), Our Duke (2016)
 Dr P. J. Moriarty Novice Chase  - (2) Carrigeen Victor (2005), 	Bostons Angel (2011)
 Golden Cygnet Novice Hurdle  - (2) Roberto Goldback (2009), Coole River (2010)
 Spring Juvenile Hurdle  - (1) Personal Column (2008)
 Chanelle Pharma Novice Hurdle  - (1) 	Oscars Well (2011)
 Ryanair Novice Chase  - (2) Oh So Grumpy (1994), Moscow Flyer (2002)
 Irish Daily Mirror Novice Hurdle - (1) Got Attitude (2008)

 Great Britain
 Cheltenham Gold Cup - (1) Sizing John (2017)
 Champion Hurdle - (1) Jezki (2014)
 Queen Mother Champion Chase - (2) Moscow Flyer (2003,2005)
 Coronation Stakes - (2) Alpha Centauri (2018), Alpine Star (2020)
 Falmouth Stakes - (1) Alpha Centauri (2018)
 Cheveley Park Stakes - (1) Millisle (2019)
 Arkle Challenge Trophy - (1)  Moscow Flyer (2002)
 RSA Insurance Novices' Chase - (1) Bostons Angel (2011)
 Champion Bumper - (1) Cork All Star (2007)
 Tingle Creek Chase  -(2) Moscow Flyer (2003,2004)
 Melling Chase - (2) - Moscow Flyer (2004,2005)
 Aintree Hurdle - (1) Supasundae (2019)
 Fighting Fifth Hurdle - (1) 	Space Trucker (1996)

 France
 Prix Jacques Le Marois - (1) Alpha Centauri (2018)
 Prix Marcel Boussac - (1) Albigna (2019)

References

External links 
 

1947 births
People from County Kildare
Living people
Irish racehorse trainers
Irish female equestrians